The Complete Album Collection Vol. One is a forty-seven disc box set released on November 4, 2013, by Bob Dylan. It includes thirty-five albums released between 1962 and 2012, six live albums, and a compilation album unique to the set, Side Tracks, which contains previously released material unavailable on regular studio or live albums.

Contents 
This release is the first time that the 1973 album Dylan has been released on CD in North America. Fourteen of the albums have been remastered for this release. Also included was a hardcover book featuring extensive new album-by-album liner notes penned by Clinton Heylin and a new introduction written by Bill Flanagan.

The Bob Dylan Complete Album Collection Vol. One was also available as a limited-edition harmonica-shaped USB stick containing all the music, in both MP3 and FLAC lossless formats, with a digital version of the hardcover booklet, housed in a deluxe numbered box.

The 2013 remasters, fourteen of which have never been remastered before, were prepared for the release of this box set.

Although Shot of Love was omitted from the list of the 14 newly remastered titles announced in the pre-release promotional material, it is in fact remastered like the other 2013 remasters. However, the 2013 remaster of Self Portrait that is used is the remaster that first appeared in the deluxe edition of The Bootleg Series Vol. 10, released in August 2013.

The new 2013 remastered albums are available only in this box set with the sole exception of the Japanese-only CD versions released by Sony Music Entertainment (Japan) in 2014. These albums are marked as including cardboard mini LP sleeves + Blu-spec CD2.

Side Tracks

All songs written and composed by Bob Dylan, except where noted.

Missing songs
Despite the "completeness" of this collection there are still several released recordings which were not included:
 "Corrina, Corrina" (B-side version)
 "Just Like Tom Thumb's Blues" (live in Liverpool) (B-side version)
 "If You Gotta Go, Go Now" (Netherlands single version)
 "Spanish is the Loving Tongue" (B-side version)
 "George Jackson" (Big Band version)
 "Rita May"
 "Trouble in Mind"
 "Let It Be Me" (European B-side version)
 "Angel Flying Too Close to the Ground"
 "Band of the Hand"
 "Shelter from the Storm" (alternate version from the Jerry Maguire soundtrack)
 "Most Likely You Go Your Way And I'll Go Mine" (Mark Ronson Remix) (online single)

References

Bob Dylan compilation albums
2013 compilation albums